Heath Nelson Macquarrie (September 18, 1919 – January 2, 2002) was a Canadian politician, teacher, scholar, and writer. Macquarrie described himself as a Red Tory, using the term in the title of his autobiography Red Tory Blues.

During the October Crisis of 1970, he agonized over the implementation of the War Measures Act, and was prepared to vote against it, but relented for the sake of keeping the Tory caucus united behind Robert Stanfield. Writing in retrospect, Macquarrie described his vote in favour of the Act as "fundamentally wrong".

He was first elected to the House of Commons of Canada as a Progressive Conservative candidate in the 1957 federal election that brought John Diefenbaker to power. He served as a member of parliament for twenty-two consecutive years, until he was appointed to the Senate of Canada in 1979 on the advice of Joe Clark. He sat in the upper house for a further fifteen years, retiring at the mandatory age of 75 in 1994.

He was publicly loyal to Clark's successor, Brian Mulroney, but privately disagreed with the government on several occasions, once saying during a caucus meeting, "You know, a lot of people think I have a prominent nose because of my enjoyment of a certain beverage. Well, that's all nonsense. I got it that way by having to hold it so often while voting for some of Mulroney's bills."

Macquarrie remained active following his retirement from the Senate in 1994, by contributing a column to the Hill Times and to newspapers in his home province of Prince Edward Island.

Macquarrie was educated at Prince of Wales College, the University of Manitoba, the University of New Brunswick and McGill University. He studied for his doctorate at McGill, choosing for his thesis topic Robert Borden. He lectured at Brandon University and at Mount Allison University, in economics, political science and international relations.

He edited and wrote the introduction to the published edition of Sir Robert Borden's diaries. An admirer of the World War I-era prime minister, Macquarrie considered Borden to be the architect of Canadian independence.

Bibliography 
 The Conservative Party (1965)
 Robert Laird Borden: His Memoirs (1969, 2 vols.) (ed.)
 Canada and the Third World (1976)
 Canada and the Palestinians, 1947–1982 (1982), 
 Red Tory Blues: A Political Memoir (1992),

Archives 
There is a Heath Nelson Macquarrie fonds at Library and Archives Canada.

Electoral record

References

External links 
 

1919 births
2002 deaths
Canadian Presbyterians
Canadian non-fiction writers
Canadian political scientists
Canadian senators from Prince Edward Island
McGill University alumni
Members of the House of Commons of Canada from Prince Edward Island
People from Queens County, Prince Edward Island
Progressive Conservative Party of Canada MPs
Progressive Conservative Party of Canada senators
University of Manitoba alumni
Writers from Prince Edward Island
20th-century non-fiction writers
20th-century political scientists